Posch is a surname of German origin. People with that name include:

 Alexander Posch (1890-1950), German painter
 Doris Posch (born 1973), Austrian track and road cyclist
 Fabian Posch (born 1988), Austrian handball player
 Inge Posch-Gruska (born 1962), Austrian politician
 Isaac Posch (1591-1622), Austrian composer and organist
 Krista Posch (born 1948), Italian-German television actress
 Luis Posch (active 1950s), Austrian luger
 Mario Posch (born 1967), Austrian football coach and former player
 Marion Posch (born 1972), Italian snowboarder
 Philipp Posch (born 1994), Austrian footballer
 Stefan Posch (born 1997), Austrian footballer

See also
 32821 Posch, a minor planet
 Kit violin, a German name for which is Posch
 Staatsanwalt Posch ermittelt, a German pseudo-documentary TV series which aired 2007-2008
 

Surnames of German origin